Wasyiat Hasbullah (born October 25, 1994) is an Indonesian professional footballer who plays as a right back.

Club career

PSM Makassar
He was signed for PSM Makassar to play in Indonesia Soccer Championship A in the 2016 season.

Kalteng Putra
In 2019, Wasyiat signed a one-year contract with Indonesian Liga 1 club Kalteng Putra.

Return to PSM Makassar
In 2020, it was confirmed that Wasyiat would re-join PSM Makassar, signing a year contract. This season was suspended on 27 March 2020 due to the COVID-19 pandemic. The season was abandoned and was declared void on 20 January 2021.

Career statistics

Club

References

External links
 Wasyiat Hasbullah at Liga Indonesia
 Wasyiat Hasbullah at Soccerway

Indonesian footballers
PSM Makassar players
1994 births
Living people
Association football defenders
People from Gowa Regency
21st-century Indonesian people